Walter Augustine Charsley (28 August 1869 – 1948) was an English footballer born in Stafford. The younger brother of Small Heath and England goalkeeper Chris Charsley, he played three times as a wing half for Small Heath in the Football Alliance in the 1890–91 season. He died in Small Heath, Birmingham.

Notes

References

1869 births
1948 deaths
Sportspeople from Stafford
English footballers
Association football wing halves
Birmingham City F.C. players
Date of death missing
Football Alliance players